The Hoogovens Wijk aan Zee Steel Chess Tournament 1989 was the 51st edition of the Wijk aan Zee Chess Tournament. It was held in Wijk aan Zee in January 1989 and was jointly won by four players: Viswanathan Anand, Predrag Nikolić, Zoltán Ribli and Gyula Sax.

{| class="wikitable" style="text-align: center;"
|+ 51st Hoogovens tournament, group A, January 1989, Wijk aan Zee, Netherlands, Category XIII (2551)
! !! Player !! Rating !! 1 !! 2 !! 3 !! 4 !! 5 !! 6 !! 7 !! 8 !! 9 !! 10 !! 11 !! 12 !! 13 !! 14 !! Total !! TPR !! Place
|-
|-style="background:#ccffcc;"
| 1 || align=left| || 2515 ||  || ½ || ½ || ½ || 1 || ½ || 0 || 1 || 1 || 0 || ½ || 1 || ½ || ½ || 7½ || 2611 || 1–4
|-
|-style="background:#ccffcc;"
| 2 || align="left" | || 2605 || ½ ||  || ½ || ½ || ½ || 1 || ½ || ½ || 1 || 0 || ½ || 0 || 1 || 1 || 7½ || 2604 || 1–4
|-
|-style="background:#ccffcc;"
| 3 || align="left" | || 2625 || ½ || ½ ||  || ½ || 0 || 1 || ½ || ½ || ½ || 1 || ½ || ½ || ½ || 1 || 7½ || 2602 || 1–4
|-
|-style="background:#ccffcc;"
| 4 || align="left" | || 2610 || ½ || ½ || ½ ||  || ½ || 0 || 1 || 0 || ½ || 1 || 1 || ½ || 1 || ½ || 7½ || 2604 || 1–4
|-
| 5 || align="left" | || 2590 || 0 || ½ || 1 || ½ ||  || ½ || ½ || ½ || 0 || 1 || ½ || 1 || ½ || ½ || 7 || 2577 || 5–6
|-
| 6 || align="left" | || 2500 || ½ || 0 || 0 || 1 || ½ ||  || ½ || 1 || 0 || 1 || ½ || ½ || ½ || 1 || 7 || 2584 || 5–6
|-
| 7 || align="left" | || 2560 || 1 || ½ || ½ || 0 || ½ || ½ ||  || ½ || ½ || ½ || 1 || ½ || 0 || ½ || 6½ || 2550 || 7–8
|-
| 8 || align="left" | || 2520 || 0 || ½ || ½ || 1 || ½ || 0 || ½ ||  || 0 || 0 || 1 || 1 || 1 || ½ || 6½ || 2553 || 7–8
|-
| 9 || align="left" | || 2545 || 0 || 0 || ½ || ½ || 1 || 1 || ½ || 1 ||  || ½ || 0 || ½ || ½ || 0 || 6 || 2523 || 9–11
|-
| 10 || align="left" | || 2520 || 1 || 1 || 0 || 0 || 0 || 0 || ½ || 1 || ½ ||  || ½ || 1 || 0 || ½ || 6 || 2524 || 9–11
|-
| 11 || align="left" | || 2600 || ½ || ½ || ½ || 0 || ½ || ½ || 0 || 0 || 1 || ½ ||  || ½ || ½ || 1 || 6 || 2518 || 9–11
|- 
| 12 || align="left" | || 2580 || 0 || 1 || ½ || ½ || 0 || ½ || ½ || 0 || ½ || 0 || ½ ||  || 1 ||   ½|| 5½ || 2492 || 12–13
|-
| 13 || align="left" | || 2500 || ½ || 0 || ½ || 0 || ½ || ½ || 1 || 0 || ½ || 1 || ½ || 0 ||  || ½ || 5½ ||  2498 || 12–13
|-
| 14 || align="left" | || 2445 || ½ || 0 || 0 || ½ || ½ || 0 || ½ || ½ || 1 || ½ || 0 || ½ || ½ ||  || 5 || 2472 || 14
|}

References

Tata Steel Chess Tournament
1989 in chess
1989 in Dutch sport